Qirata  is a Syrian village located in Qalaat al-Madiq Subdistrict in Al-Suqaylabiyah District, Hama.  According to the Syria Central Bureau of Statistics (CBS), Qirata had a population of 267 in the 2004 census. Its inhabitants are predominantly Sunni Muslims.

References

Bibliography

 

Populated places in al-Suqaylabiyah District